The Chanakya College of Management (CCM) (previously Chanakya College of Management) is the second management college in the Bhaktapur district of Nepal running under Chanakya Educators Bhaktapur Pvt Ltd, established in 2008. It is affiliated to HSEB for 10 plus 2 levels and Tribhuvan University for BBS. The college plans to extend its faculty up to Master's Degree in Management.

Students' service and facilities

Classrooms 
The classrooms accommodate not more than 35 students.

Cafeteria 
Food is provided by the college cafe. Hot and cold drinks and snacks are available.

Transportation 
Bus services are available from Kathmandu, Bhaktapur, Kavrepalanchok and Lalitpur.

Extracurricular activities

Sports 
Sports activities include volleyball, basketball, table tennis and other indoor games.

Educational trips 
Field trips and hiking are arranged to domestic tourist attractions. An annual picnic is held to give opportunities for students' socialization.

Internal evaluation 
Monthly progress reports on homework, note presentation and classroom performance are sent to parents.

External links 
 HSEB
 TU
 modern
 www.chanakya.edu.np

References

Educational institutions established in 2008
Universities and colleges in Nepal
Tribhuvan University
Business schools
2008 establishments in Nepal